The Belarus women's national football team represents Belarus in international women's football. The team is governed by the Football Federation of Belarus (Беларуская фэдэрацыя па футболу).

After the 2022 Russian invasion of Ukraine, FIFA and UEFA, the European governing body for football, banned Belarusian national and club teams from hosting international competitions.

History

Belarus first appeared in a FIFA/UEFA qualification stage in the 1997 European Championship, where it was paired with the Czech Republic, Poland and Estonia. In its first official match they lost 0–1 to the Czech Republic on 7 October 1995. In May 1996 they attained their first official win by beating 3–0 Poland, which had defeated them 2–0 in the first match. In the 1999 World Cup qualifying Belarus was ranked in Class B, with no qualifying options.

In the 2001 European Championship qualifying, again in Class B, Belarus beat Estonia 4–1 and 0–7, Israel 0–5 and 1–0 and Slovakia 1–0, and tied 1–1 in Romania, but the Romanians earned the spot in the promotion play-offs after beating Belarus 0–1. Belarus lost 6–1 to Slovakia in the last match.

In the 2003 World Cup qualifying, Class B,  Belarus was 3rd, tied with Slovakia.

In the 2005 European Championship qualification, Class B, Belarus beat Estonia 5–0 and 1–3, Kazakhstan 0–2 and 8–1, and Israel 0–2. They just conceded two points, from a home 1–1 tie against Israel. Belarus topped the group for the first time, but there were no promotion play-offs as the qualifying system was unified for 2009.

In the 2007 FIFA Women's World Cup qualification Belarus was promoted for the First Category, and ended second to last with 7 points. In the 2009 European Championship qualifying Belarus ended second to last. In the 2011 World Cup qualifying Belarus was 3rd. In the 2013 European Championship qualifying Belarus was grouped with Finland, Ukraine, Slovakia and Estonia.

Results and fixtures

The following is a list of match results in the last 12 months, as well as any future matches that have been scheduled.

Legend

2022

Results and Fixtures – Soccerway.com

Coaching staff

Current coaching staff

Manager history

Players

Current squad
The following players were called up for a friendly match against  on 26 October 2021.

Caps and goals accurate up to and including 20 June 2021.

Recent call-ups
The following players have been called up to a Belarus squad in the past 12 months.

INJ Withdrew due to injury
PRE Preliminary squad / standby
RET Retired from the national team
SUS Serving suspension
WD Player withdrew from the squad due to non-injury issue.

Competitive record

FIFA Women's World Cup

*Draws include knockout matches decided on penalty kicks.

UEFA Women's Championship

*Draws include knockout matches decided on penalty kicks.

See also

Sport in Belarus
Football in Belarus
Belarus men's national football team

References

External links
Official website
FIFA profile

 
national
European women's national association football teams